James Hutchins Johnson (June 3, 1802 – September 2, 1887) was a businessman, militia officer, and politician from Bath, New Hampshire.  Among the offices in which he served was U.S. Representative from 1845 to 1849.

Early life
Johnson was born in Bath, New Hampshire on June 3, 1802.  He was educated in Bath's public schools, and then became a merchant and businessman.  Among his ventures were a store and sawmill.  from the mid-1820s to the mid-1830s he resided in Lisbon, New Hampshire, afterwards returning to Bath.

Military career
In 1826, Johnson joined the New Hampshire Militia's 32nd Regiment as its paymaster.  He later served as its adjutant, and eventually commanded the regiment with the rank of colonel.

Politics
He was deputy sheriff of Grafton County in 1824 and 1825.  In 1836 he was elected to the New Hampshire House of Representatives.  Johnson was a member of the New Hampshire Senate in 1839 and a member of the New Hampshire Executive Council in 1842 and 1845.

Johnson was elected as a Democrat to the Twenty-ninth and Thirtieth Congresses (March 4, 1845 – March 3, 1849).

Death
He died in Bath, New Hampshire, September 2, 1887, and was interred at Bath Village Cemetery.

Family
In 1828, Johnson married Jane Hutchins of Bath.  They were the parents of six children, all but one of whom died before reaching adulthood.  In 1847, Johnson married to Sophia Orne Edwards of Springfield, Massachusetts.  They were the parents of a two sons (John Howard and Stanley Edwards) and one daughter (Sarah Hall).

References

Sources

Books

External links

James Hutchins Johnson at The Political Graveyard

1802 births
1887 deaths
Members of the Executive Council of New Hampshire
Democratic Party New Hampshire state senators
American militia officers
Democratic Party members of the United States House of Representatives from New Hampshire
19th-century American politicians
People from Bath, New Hampshire